George Richard Pain (1793 – 26 December 1838) was born into a family of English architects.  His grandfather was William Pain, his father James Pain and his brother also James. George Richard served as an apprentice architect to John Nash of London. George Richard and James were commissioned by the Board of First Fruits to design churches and glebe houses in Ireland. He settled in Cork, Ireland. Many of his designs were produced in collaboration with his brother James Pain who practiced in Limerick.

Biography
Pain arrived in Ireland circa 1816, about five years after his brother James. Settling in Limerick, Pain remained in Ireland for the rest of his life. He died aged 45 on 26 December 1838. He was buried in the cemetery of St Mary's Church, Shandon.

Buildings

 O'Neil Crowley Bridge (formerly Brunswick Bridge), Cork 
Strancally Castle County Waterford
 Christ Church, Cork (redesign of exterior and interior)
 St. James' Church, Mallow, County Cork
 Dromoland Castle, County Clare

References

Sources

External links
 IGS - Catalogue of Irish Theses and Dissertations Relating to Architecture and the Allied Arts (archived 2011)

Irish architects
English ecclesiastical architects
Architects of Roman Catholic churches
1838 deaths
1793 births